Wanda Giorgina Toscanini Horowitz (December 7, 1907, Milan, Italy, – August 21, 1998) was the daughter of the conductor Arturo Toscanini and the wife of pianist Vladimir Horowitz. 

As a child, Wanda studied piano and voice.  She never pursued a professional music career, fearing she could never live up to her father's exacting standards.  Despite this, she was one of the few people who was willing to stand up to her father.  When Arturo Toscanini refused to speak with her sister, Wally, following her affair with a married man, it was Wanda who confronted her father and insisted he reestablish contact.  

At a Toscanini concert, she spotted the critic Virgil Thomson dozing during the performance.  Knowing that Thomson frequently gave her father negative reviews, she approached him and announced, “I am Wanda Toscanini Horowitz, and I saw you sleep from the first note to the last.  I hope you enjoyed the performance.”

Marriage to Vladimir Horowitz

She was equally direct with her husband, whom she married in 1933.  In the 1950s, when Horowitz was playing a Schubert sonata, she complained of the work's length, which persuaded the pianist to forgo a repeat.  She pointedly declined to accompany her husband for much of his 1983 tour, when he refused to accept that medications were adversely affecting his playing.

Wanda and Horowitz separated in 1948.  Byron Janis, one of Horowitz's students, has written that he and Wanda were involved in a brief affair during this period.  Horowitz and Wanda reconciled in 1951.  In the aftermath of Horowitz’s 1953 nervous breakdown, she remained by his side.  While she took pride in being married to the legendary virtuoso, she also confided that it was, at times “a cross to bear.”  However, others have implied that Wanda's stern personality, in part, led to Horowitz's breakdown.  Arthur Rubinstein stated that "Wanda was a very hard woman—hard as stone, and this was undoubtedly a factor that led to Volodya's collapse."

Wanda frequently referred to their only child, daughter Sonia (1934–1975), stating that Sonia's death was the greatest agony a mother could bear.  More than a decade after Sonia's death, she was observed bursting into tears at the mention of Sonia's name. 

Despite being raised Catholic, Wanda was opposed to the Catholic Church’s positions on many issues including birth control.  Like her husband, Wanda held firmly liberal political views.  She once referred to Ronald Reagan as “a second-rate actor and a second-rate President.” 
  
Following Horowitz's death in 1989, Wanda bought a 200-year-old farm house that she named "Pinci's Acres" (Pinci was Wanda's nickname for Horowitz) in Ashley Falls, Massachusetts, and stocked it with American antiques and Horowitz memorabilia.  She then divided her time between this home and the New York City townhouse.  An animal lover who volunteered for the ASPCA, she adopted several stray cats.

As Horowitz's sole heir, Wanda was in charge of her late husband's musical legacy.  In the 1990s, she approved the release of several previously unavailable recordings.  She also rejected several recordings, most notably Balakirev's Islamey, which she said was "flashy" repertoire that did a disservice to her husband's memory.  Copies of the recording eventually surfaced on the Internet, leading to requests for its release.  In 2009, the recording was issued. 

Wanda was buried alongside her husband in the Toscanini family tomb at Cimitero Monumentale in Milan.  In May, 2004, vandals broke into the crypt and opened her coffin, possibly searching for jewelry.

Wanda Toscanini Horowitz appeared in several filmed documentaries about her husband, most notably The Last Romantic, in which she responded to her husband's artistry and reflected on her life in the world of music as daughter and wife of two incomparable musicians.  A friend of Woody Allen, she had a small speaking part in his film Crimes and Misdemeanors.

References

1907 births
1998 deaths
20th-century Italian women
Burials at the Cimitero Monumentale di Milano
Italian expatriates in the United States
People from Milan